Sphecosoma simile is a moth in the subfamily Arctiinae. It was described by William Schaus in 1894. It is found in Venezuela.

References

Moths described in 1894
Sphecosoma